The 5th People's Choice Awards, honoring the best in popular culture for 1978, were held in 1979. They were broadcast on CBS.

Winners

Favorite Female Performer in a New TV Program:
Pam Dawber

Favorite Female TV Performer:
Mary Tyler Moore,
Carol Burnett

Favorite Motion Picture Supporting Actor:
Jerry Reed

Favorite Non-Musical Motion Picture:
Animal House

Favorite Overall Motion Picture:
Grease

Favorite Overall New TV Program:
Mork & Mindy

Favorite All-Around Male Entertainer:
Burt Reynolds

Favorite Motion Picture Actress:
Olivia Newton-John

Favorite All-Around Female Entertainer:
Carol Burnett

Favorite Motion Picture Supporting Actress:
Stockard Channing

Favorite New TV Comedy Program:
Mork & Mindy

Favorite TV Comedy Program:
M*A*S*H

Favorite TV Dramatic Program:
Little House on the Prairie

Favorite TV Variety Program:
Donny & Marie

Favorite Male Performer in a New TV Program:
Robin Williams

Favorite Motion Picture Actor:
Burt Reynolds

Favorite Male TV Performer:
Alan Alda

Favorite Musical Motion Picture:
Grease

Favorite Female Musical Performer:
Olivia Newton-John

Favorite Male Musical Performer:
Billy Joel,
Andy Gibb

Favorite New Song:
"Double Vision"

Favorite New TV Dramatic Program:
Battlestar Galactica

References

People's Choice Awards
1978 awards
1979 in American television
1978 awards in the United States
March 1979 events in the United States